Arwos is a settlement in Kenya's Nandy County, in the former Rift Valley Province. It is roughly 152 miles NW of Nairobi, the capital of Kenya.

Ethnicity 
The people of the Rift Valley are a meshwork of different tribes; the Kalenjin and the Maasai are the two best-known.  Most of Kenya's top runners come from the Kalenjin community.  The Maasai people have the most recognizable cultural identity, both nationally and internationally; they serve as Kenya's international cultural symbol.

References 

Populated places in Nandi County